This is a list of seasons played by Bohemian F.C. in the League of Ireland.

Seasons

References

 
Republic of Ireland association football club seasons